Jade Legacy is an 2021 fantasy novel by Fonda Lee published by Orbit and the sequel to Jade War, released
on November 30, 2021. It is the third and final novel in The Green Bone Saga, which began with Jade City, and follows the surviving players from the end of Jade War as they plot a path for peace between nations and within Janloon's competing tribes, The Mountain clan and No Peak Clan, over jade distribution. Jade Legacy won the 2022 Locus Award for Best Fantasy Novel and the 2022 Aurora Award for Best Novel.

Plot 
With the mass distribution of jade occurring after the events of Jade War, forces from all sides will swarm Janloon, seeking jade's magical abilities. As one worldwide crisis ends, more wars break out internationally and within Kekon, as Hilo and Shae struggle to hold their power and prepare the children of their family to take up the No Peak Clan legacy. At the same time, they wage a continued war against The Mountain clan as its power continues to grow.

Development history 
Jade Legacy is Lee's third adult novel. In an interview with Lightspeed, Lee said of the novel's writing process: "I normally write a book a year, but the Green Bone novels are twice as long and about five times more complicated than my previous books" and that she plans on continuing writing adult books down the line over further young adult novels, stating she plans on "be[ing] focused on the Green Bone Saga for some time." In 2020, Lee revealed that Jade Legacy would take place over the span of 20 years.

Literary significance and reception 
Jade Legacy received critical acclaim ahead of its release, earning a starred review and weekly pick status from Publishers Weekly, a starred review from Library Journal, and a glowing review from NPR's book reviews. Publishers Weekly called it "sprawling, complex, and steeped in Asian culture and sensibilities..." and said "Lee expertly balances conflict and growth on both individual and societal levels, giving this massive story weight, as every decision can potentially change the world. In both meeting and subverting expectations at every turn, Lee guides her cast to a deeply satisfying, well-earned conclusion.". Kristi Chadwick of Library Journal said "Lee's storytelling is masterful and will leave readers heartbroken and hopeful." NPR book reviewer Jason Sheehan called Jade Legacy "Thirty years of love and war and vengeance and betrayal..." and that "Ultimately, that's what Jade Legacy is about. Endings. And then what comes next.".

Awards and nominations

Adaptations 
In 2020, it was announced that a TV series based on the first novel in The Green Bone Saga, Jade City, was being developed at Peacock, with Lee serving as a consulting producer. In July 2022, it was announced that Peacock had canceled the project, but Lee shared on Twitter that the team were seeking another service to take it up.

References

External links 
 Review: Jade Legacy, Publishers Weekly
 Jade Legacy by Fonda Lee, Library Journal
 'Jade Legacy,' final in the Green Bone Saga trilogy, is about endings, Jason Sheehan, NPR 
 Nadia Elbaar Reviews Jade Legacy by Fonda Lee, Nadia Elbaar, Locus
 Jade Legacy by Fonda Lee, Adri Joy, Strange Horizons

2021 Canadian novels
2021 American novels
2021 fantasy novels
Orbit Books books